Jonathan Palata is a British heavyweight boxer with a professional record of 7-1 (3). 

Born in the Congo, Palata moved to South London at 18 months of age where he grew up in Bellingham and after being taught the basics by his father, he boxed at Palmer's Academy from the age of 14.

After a hiatus he resumed boxing in 2011 collating a record of 36 wins from 40 fights including silver at the 2014 Haringey Cup and winning the London ABA's in 2015, knocking down opponent Ozzie Osimodrie en route to a points victory.

He turned over to the paid ranks in 2018 training out of the Peacock Boxing Gym in East London, under the tutelage of trainer Don Charles.

Palata went on to win his first seven fights with three knockouts. His lone loss came on points in the Ultimate Boxxer tournament in December 2019 when he was outpointed over three rounds by Danny Whitaker.

References

Living people
Boxers (sport)
Year of birth missing (living people)